The EN 10034 "Structural steel I and H sections. Tolerances on shape and dimensions" is a European Standard.
The standard is developed by the technical committee ECISS/TC 103 - Structural steels other than reinforcements.

See also 
 I-beam
 EN 10024
 
Construction standards
10034
Structural engineering standards
Structural steel